The Deputy Chief of the Naval Staff (DCNS) is a senior appointment in the Royal Navy currently held by the Second Sea Lord. The incumbent is usually a three-star rank and had a NATO ranking code of OF-8, but the position has previously been held by an acting two-star ranked officer and a four-star ranked officer.

First and Second World Wars
The position was originally established in 1917 on the Board of Admiralty. It essentially replaced the position of Chief of the Admiralty War Staff.

The first incumbent was Vice Admiral Henry Oliver, the Chief of the Admiralty War Staff, who was appointed Deputy Chief of Naval Staff on 31 May 1917. The duties of the Deputy Chief of the Naval Staff, were shared with the  First Sea Lord and Chief of the Naval Staff and with the Assistant Chief of the Naval Staff.

In September 1917 the new post of Deputy First Sea Lord was created to meet the demand of wartime operational requirements. The Deputy Chief of the Naval Staff then reported to the Deputy First Sea Lord until 1919 when that post was abolished. The Deputy Chief of the Naval Staff then resumed his previous role and reported to the First Sea Lord until 1941. Duties as of 1917 included:

 Relieve the First Sea Lord of all the routine matters dealt with by sections under his immediate direction
 Fleet Movements
 All operations in the North Sea, the White Sea, the Baltic, and the Dover Area, except British coastal measures for the protection of trade
 Offensive measures in the Mediterranean and abroad generally
 The protection of trade in the North Sea, except the coastal trade on the East Coast of Great Britain.  North Sea trade includes the Dutch trade, trade between Scandinavian countries and Great Britain, and Baltic trade, but not convoy from Lerwick, Southward
 All questions relating to foreign stations, except protection of trade against submarine and mine attack
 Policy of blockade and all questions relating thereto and to contraband of war
 Organisation, movements and protection of troop transports and other vessels against attack by surface vessels; Atlantic convoys other than troop convoys being under the Assistant Chief of the Naval Staff

This remained in place until 1939. Duties after 1939 included:
 Operations of War: All large Questions of Naval Policy and Maritime Warfare
 Fighting and Sea-going Efficiency of the Fleet and its Organisation
 Distribution and Movements of all Ships in Commission and in Reserve
 Superintendence of the Naval Staff and the Hydrographic Department
 Administering Naval communications
 Superintendence of the Assistant Chief of the Naval Staff
 Superintendence of the Director of the Naval Intelligence Division

In 1941 the DCNS post was renamed Vice Chief of the Naval Staff; this continued until 1946. After the Second World War the title was changed back to DCNS, and continued until 1968.

From 2013
In 2013 the office was brought back once more and the current Deputy Chief of the Naval Staff became both a member of the Admiralty Board and a member of the Navy Board of the Ministry of Defence.

Duties circa March 2014 included:

Full command of all deployable Fleet units including the Royal Marines
Responsible for providing ships, submarines, aircraft and Royal Marine units ready in all respects for any operations that the UK Government requires
Responsible for the delivery of the Naval Service's current and future personnel, equipment and infrastructure

Deputy Chiefs of the Naval Staff
Incumbents include:

Note: Post is renamed 1941 to 1946 its responsibilities are taken over by the Vice Chief of the Naval Staff

Note: From 1957 to 1965 the post was held jointly by the Fifth Sea Lord

Note: Post was vacant from 1969 to 2012; it was re-established in 2013. From 2013 to 2015 it was held by the Fleet Commander and from 2016 it was held by the Second Sea Lord

See also
Assistant Chief of the Naval Staff
Vice Chief of the Naval Staff
First Sea Lord
Second Sea Lord
Third Sea Lord
Fourth Sea Lord
Fifth Sea Lord

References

Attribution
Primary source for this article is by  Harley, Simon and Lovell, Tony, (2016) Deputy Chief of Naval Staff, The Dreadnought Project, http://dreadnoughtproject.org.

Sources
 Rodger. N.A.M., (1979) The Admiralty (offices of state), T. Dalton, Lavenham, .
 Naval Staff, Training and Staff Duties Division (1929). The Naval Staff of the Admiralty. Its Work and Development. B.R. 1845 (late C.B. 3013). Copy at The National Archives. ADM 234/434.
 Mackie, Colin, (2010–2014), British Armed Services between 1860 and the present day — I Royal Navy – Senior Appointments, http://www.gulabin.com/.

External links
Second Sea Lord and Deputy Chief of Naval Staff
http://www.dreadnoughtproject.org/tfs/index.php/Deputy Chief of Naval Staff
http://www.gulabin.com/Royal Navy – Senior Appointments
http://www.naval-history.net/Royal Navy Organisation 1939 to 1945
http://www.naval-history.net/British Admiralty and its functions 1914

D
1917 establishments in the United Kingdom
Admiralty during World War II